Dawn of Solace is a heavy metal side-project from Finland, started in 2005 by Tuomas Saukkonen (Before the Dawn, Wolfheart).

History 
While in the writing process for the third Before the Dawn album, The Ghost, Saukkonen ended up with over 30 written songs. The first plan was to make a double album for Before the Dawn, but some of the material was slower, more melodic and darker than the songs chosen for The Ghost and Saukkonen wanted to take things further without any limitations that Before the Dawn might create.

The result was Saukkonen's solo project, Dawn of Solace. The first album, entitled The Darkness, features a melodic sound akin to that of Before the Dawn, albeit with a much stronger gothic metal and doom metal influence. On 10 January 2013 through a press statement, Tuomas Saukkonen announced that he was putting Dawn of Solace to rest along with his other active bands (Before the Dawn, Black Sun Aeon and RoutaSielu), ending them in order to create new project called "Wolfheart", which he will entirely focus from now on. When interviewed by website KaaosZine, Tuomas replied about his decision:

"Yes I have been thinking about this already for a few years from the Before the Dawn side and first time this was brought into the table was when we were releasing the Decade of Darkness EP to celebrate the 10th year for Before the Dawn. At that time I had an idea to end the band because it just felt right to end the band at that point. The band played their biggest shows in Europe by supporting Amorphis and in Asia by supporting Stratovarius. The CDs were selling great and we ended up signing a deal with Nuclear Blast Records. The album that came after the EP titled Deathstar Rising did an amazing job in the Finnish charts ending into the top 10. Still even though we achieved a lot I started to feel like it's becoming more and more of a job for me and felt that I was drifting away from the most important thing in my life which is for the love of making music.
"At that time we also started to have a little bad chemistry within the band and it also started to reflect into the band's live performances as well as into my own motivation towards the band because I became a bit frustrated. The line-up changes in 2011 gave me more motivation and it once again started to feel like it was right thing to continue after the Rise of the Phoenix album but after the successful tours in Finland and Europe and the great response to the CD both among the fans and press really gave me the opportunity to let go of my 'old friend' from the past 14 years. I felt like a winner and decided to put it aside because I could with a large smile remember all that great things we experienced with this band.
"At some point I recognized I was just keeping the band alive and it didn't feel so right anymore. I lost the passion to make music my own way and the main reason why I had a lot of side projects like Black Sun Aeon, Routasielu, Dawn of Solace and The Final Harvest at the first place. Those were the bands where I had the ability to be artistically free and create what I wanted. Now when Before the Dawn is done it was logical for me to clean the table at once and start building something from scratch again."

In 2019 Saukkonen announced Dawn of Solace would be reforming for a second album entitled Waves to be released on 24 January 2020. The music video for the song Lead Wings was published on YouTube on 24 November 2019.

Members

Current members
 Tuomas Saukkonen – all instruments, harsh vocals (2005–2013, 2019–present)
 Mikko Heikkilä – clean vocals (2019–present)

Former members
 Lars Eikind – clean vocals (2005–2013)

Discography
The Darkness (2006)
Waves (2020)
Flames of Perdition (2022)

References

Finnish heavy metal musical groups
Finnish gothic metal musical groups
Finnish melodic death metal musical groups
Musical groups established in 1999
1999 establishments in Finland